Alamsyah Yunus (born 7 July 1986) is an Indonesian badminton player from JR Enkei Bekasi club.

Career 
In 2003, Yunus has won the national junior tournament, and in 2005 he was the runner-up at the National Championships. In 2007, he competed at the Summer Universiade, and won the mixed team bronze. Yunus has won some international tournament such as two times champion in 2010 and 2012 Indonesia International; and also 2010 and 2011 India International. At the Grand Prix level, he won the 2010 India Open and 2013 Malaysia Grand Prix Gold. Yunus also called as "King of Sirnas" after won some national series tournament.

Achievements

BWF Grand Prix (2 titles, 1 runner-up) 
The BWF Grand Prix had two levels, the BWF Grand Prix and Grand Prix Gold. It was a series of badminton tournaments sanctioned by the Badminton World Federation (BWF) which was held from 2007 to 2017.

Men's singles

  BWF Grand Prix Gold tournament
  BWF Grand Prix tournament

BWF International Challenge/Series (5 titles, 5 runners-up) 
Men's singles

  BWF International Challenge tournament
  BWF International Series tournament

References

External links 
 

1986 births
Living people
Sportspeople from Jakarta
Indonesian male badminton players
Universiade medalists in badminton
Universiade bronze medalists for Indonesia
Medalists at the 2007 Summer Universiade